Magnetic resonance is a process by which a physical excitation (resonance) is set up via magnetism.

This process was used to develop magnetic resonance imaging and Nuclear magnetic resonance spectroscopy technology.

It is also being used to develop Nuclear magnetic resonance quantum computers.

History 
The first observation of electron-spin resonance was in 1944 by Y. K. Zavosky, a Soviet physicist then teaching at Kazan State University (now Kazan Federal University). Nuclear magnetic resonance was first observed in 1946 in the US by a team led by Felix Bloch at the same time as a separate team led by Edward Mills Purcell, the two of whom would later be the 1952 Nobel Laureates in Physics.

See also

Resonant inductive coupling, a method of transferring electrical power
Magnetic resonance (quantum mechanics), a quantum resonance process
Nuclear magnetic resonance, a special case
Giant resonance
Electron paramagnetic resonance

References

Magnetic resonance imaging
Magnetism
Physical phenomena